Bhutanese names usually consist of one or two given names, and no family names, with the exception of Nepali origin names and some family names of prominent families, such as the royal family name Wangchuck. Names often have some religious significance. The second given name or the combination of the given names may indicate the gender.

References

Bhutanese culture
Names by culture